Winów  is a neighbourhood of Opole in Opole Voivodeship, in southern Poland, located in the southern part of the city.

Before 2017 it was a part of Gmina Prószków.

The name of the district is of Polish origin and comes from the word wino, which means "wine".

Notable people
Alojzy Liguda (1898–1942), Polish Catholic priest murdered in the Dachau concentration camp, Blessed of the Catholic Church

References

Neighbourhoods in Poland
Opole